Ivan Jurić (born 25 August 1975) is a Croatian professional football manager and former player who is the manager of  club Torino.

Jurić spent most of his playing career, as a midfielder, and his entire managing career in Italy.

Playing career

Club career
A versatile and technically skilled midfielder or winger, Jurić started his career with Hajduk Split, where he played from 1993 to 1997. He then moved to Spain to join Sevilla FC, where he played from 1997 to 2001, except for a short loan to Albacete in 2000. After a short time back in Croatia with Šibenik, he moved in Italy in 2001 to join Serie B team Crotone, and then moved to Genoa in 2006, following his mentor Gian Piero Gasperini, his former head coach at Crotone. Since then, he established himself as a fan favourite, being protagonist of the rossoblu's return to Serie A, and then being appointed vice-captain for the team.

He announced his retirement in June 2010, at the age of 34, contemporaneously confirming his interest in becoming a football coach.

International career
Jurić made his international debut for Croatia in a friendly match against Romania on 11 February 2009 and went on to play five times with his national team, though did not score any goals. His final international was a September 2009 World Cup qualification match against Belarus.

Coaching career
After retiring as a football, Jurić stayed at Genoa as youth team coach for the 2010–11 season. He passed the UEFA A coaching exam in June 2011.

On 5 July 2011, new Inter manager Gian Piero Gasperini unveiled Jurić as one of his first team coaches in the new club, but was removed from his post the following September together with Gasperini and his entire staff. He re-united with Gasperini in September 2012, as new assistant coach of his at Palermo.

His Crotone side won promotion in 2015–16 season to the top flight Serie A for the 2016–17 season for the first time in the club's history.

After achieving promotion with Crotone, he was offered to replace his mentor Gasperini at his former club Genoa in June 2016, which he accepted, thus becoming the new head coach of the Grifone.

He was sacked on 19 February 2017 after a 0–5 defeat against bottom-placed Pescara. He was reinstated as Genoa manager on 10 April 2017 after the sacking of Andrea Mandorlini. On 9 October 2018, he was appointed manager of Genoa for a third time. On 6 December 2018, he was sacked again after losing to third tier Virtus Entella on penalties in the Coppa Italia.

In July 2019 he was appointed at the helm of newly promoted Serie A club Hellas Verona. Under his tenure with the Gialloblu, he competed in two top flight seasons with impressive results despite having one of the smallest budgets of the league. On 28 May 2021, Hellas Verona announced to have released him from his contract; on the same day, he was unveiled as the new head coach of Torino, effective from 1 July 2021.

Managerial statistics

Honours

Coach
Individual
Panchina d'Argento (1): 2015–16

Personal life
Jurić is a self-described metalhead, with the passion for death metal music in particular. In the 2010 interview with the Italian edition of Rolling Stone, he cited Napalm Death, Obituary, Carcass, Death, Metallica, Megadeth, Ministry, Soundgarden, Soulfly as some of his favorite artists. He occasionally goes to rock and metal live shows.

References

External links

 
 Profile at AIC



1975 births
Living people
Footballers from Split, Croatia
Association football midfielders
Croatian footballers
Croatia youth international footballers
Croatia under-21 international footballers
Croatia international footballers
HNK Hajduk Split players
Sevilla FC players
Albacete Balompié players
HNK Šibenik players
F.C. Crotone players
Genoa C.F.C. players
Croatian Football League players
La Liga players
Segunda División players
Serie A players
Serie B players
Croatian expatriate footballers
Expatriate footballers in Spain
Croatian expatriate sportspeople in Spain
Expatriate footballers in Italy
Croatian expatriate sportspeople in Italy
Croatian football managers
Mantova 1911 managers
F.C. Crotone managers
Genoa C.F.C. managers
Hellas Verona F.C. managers
Torino F.C. managers
Serie A managers
Serie B managers
Croatian expatriate football managers
Expatriate football managers in Italy
Inter Milan non-playing staff